Serhiy Vasylyovych Akymenko (born 13 December 1959) is a retired Ukrainian football forward.

Honours

Club

Shakhtar Donetsk
 Soviet Cup: 1983; runner-up: 1984–85

References

External links
 

1959 births
Living people
Footballers from Donetsk
Soviet footballers
Ukrainian footballers
Soviet Top League players
Soviet Second League players
FC Shakhtar Donetsk players
FC Shakhtar Horlivka players
FC Shakhtar Snizhne players
Association football forwards